Kentontown is an unincorporated community in Robertson County, Kentucky, United States.  It lies along U.S. Route 62 and Kentucky Route 617 southwest of the city of Mount Olivet, the county seat of Robertson County.  Its elevation is 725 feet (221 m).

References

Unincorporated communities in Robertson County, Kentucky
Unincorporated communities in Kentucky